Hennadiy Volodymyrovych Lytovchenko (also known as Gennadiy Vladimirovich Litovchenko, Russian-language variant; ; ; born 11 September 1963) is a Ukrainian football coach and former player who played as a midfielder.

Career
Lytovchenko was member of the Soviet squad that was European runner up in the 1988 European Football Championship.

In 1983, Lytovchenko took part in the Summer Spartakiad of the Peoples of the USSR in the team of Ukrainian SSR.

Honours
Dnipro Dnipropetrovsk
 Soviet Top League: 1983

Dynamo Kyiv
 Soviet Top League: 1990
 USSR Cup: 1990

Olympiacos
 Greek Cup: 1992

Soviet Union
European Football Championship runner-up: 1988

Individual
 Soviet Footballer of the Year: 1984
 Ukrainian Footballer of the Year: 1984

References

External links
 
 
 Gennadiy Litovchenko in Olympiakos Greece
 

1963 births
Living people
People from Kamianske
Sportspeople from Dnipropetrovsk Oblast
Soviet footballers
Ukrainian footballers
Association football midfielders
Dual internationalists (football)
Soviet Union international footballers
Ukraine international footballers
UEFA Euro 1988 players
1986 FIFA World Cup players
1990 FIFA World Cup players
FC Dynamo Kyiv players
Olympiacos F.C. players
AEL Limassol players
FC Chornomorets Odesa players
FC Dnipro players
FC Arsenal Kyiv players
FC Admira Wacker Mödling players
Soviet Top League players
Ukrainian Premier League players
Super League Greece players
Cypriot First Division players
Austrian Football Bundesliga players
Ukrainian football managers
FC Kryvbas Kryvyi Rih managers
FC Metalist Kharkiv managers
FC Kharkiv managers
FC Arsenal Kharkiv managers
FC Dynamo-2 Kyiv managers
Soviet expatriate footballers
Ukrainian expatriate footballers
Soviet expatriate sportspeople in Greece
Ukrainian expatriate sportspeople in Greece
Expatriate footballers in Greece
Ukrainian expatriate sportspeople in Austria
Expatriate footballers in Austria
Ukrainian expatriate sportspeople in Cyprus
Expatriate footballers in Cyprus
Ukrainian expatriate football managers
Ukrainian expatriate sportspeople in Russia
Expatriate football managers in Russia
Recipients of the Order of Merit (Ukraine), 2nd class
Recipients of the Order of Merit (Ukraine), 3rd class